Sanneh may refer to:
Amadou Sanneh, Gambian politician and accountant
Bubacarr Sanneh, Gambian footballer
Kelefa Sanneh, English-American journalist
Lamin Sanneh, theologian and historian
Ramatoulie DK Sanneh, Gambian army general
Suwaibou Sanneh, Gambian sprinter
Tony Sanneh, American soccer player

See also